Huldre was a Danish folk metal band from Copenhagen. It combines traditional Danish and Nordic folk music and folklore with rock, and metal. The group has female vocals with violin, hurdy-gurdy, flute, guitar, lute, bass guitar and drums.

Huldre was awarded third place in the Wacken Open Air Battle 2014.

In 2019, Huldre announced their decision to part ways, along with their farewell concerts at Wacken Winter Nights, Århus and Copenhagen which took place on February 24, March 16 and March 29, respectively.

Discography
 2010 - Huldre (Demo)
 2012 - Intet Menneskebarn (No human child)
 2016 - Tusmørke

Members
 Nanna Barslev, Vocals
 Bjarne Kristiansen, Bass guitar
 Troels Noergaard, Hurdy-gurdy and Flute
 Laura Beck, Violin
 Lasse Olufson, Guitar and Lute
 Jacob Lund, Drums and Percussion

References

External links
 Official website

Nordic folk music
Danish folk music groups
Danish folk metal musical groups
Musical groups established in 2009
2009 establishments in Denmark